The following is a list of major lakes of Brazil.

 Agua Vermelha
 Araros Lake
 Baia de Caxiuana
 Balbina Dam
 Banabuiu Lake
 Bariri Reservoir
 Billings Reservoir
 Caracaranã
 Castanhão Dam
 Coari Lake
 Emborcacao Dam
 Furnas Lake
 Grajau Lake
 Grande de Manacapuru
 Guarapiranga
 Ibitinga Reservoir
 Itaparica Reservoir
 Itarare Lake
 Itumbiara Dam
 Lake Juturnaiba
 Represa de Eng Souza Dias (Jupia)
 Marimbondo Dam
 Mirim Lagoon, on the border with Uruguay
 Mundaú Lagoon
 Oros Lake
 Paranoá Lake
 Patos Lagoon
 Eng Sérgio Motta Dam (Porto Primavera)
 Sao Simao Dam
 Serra da Mesa Dam (Sao Felix)
 Sobradinho Reservoir
 Tapajos Lake

Sources
LakeNet at Worldlakes.org

See also

Movimento dos Atingidos por Barragens

Lists of landforms of Brazil
Brazil